Jeffrey Lippa is an American actor best known for his roles in such films and television series as American Pop, Alice, and Murder, She Wrote.
Personal Life:
Married: Amanda Boyington-Lippa 2000 to present. 
Children: 1 son. Reef Boyington Lippa born 2003

References

External links

Living people
American male film actors
American male television actors
Year of birth missing (living people)